Ametabolism is a type of growth or life cycle in insects in which there is slight or no metamorphosis, only a gradual increase in size. It is present only in primitive wingless insects: the orders Archaeognatha and Zygentoma.

See also
Hemimetabolism
Holometabolism

References

External links
 http://www.biology-online.org/dictionary/Ametabolism
 https://en.wiktionary.org/wiki/ametabolic

Insect developmental biology